The 1921–22 season was the 22nd season of competitive football in Belgium.

Overview
Beerschot AC won the Division I. At the end of the season, FC Malinois and RC de Gand were relegated to the Promotion, while Uccle Sport and Berchem Sport were promoted.

National team

* Belgium score given first

Key
 H = Home match
 A = Away match
 N = On neutral ground
 F = Friendly
 o.g. = own goal

Honours

Final league tables

Division I

Promotion

External links
RSSSF archive - Final tables 1895-2002
Belgian clubs history